Aetorrachi may refer to several places in Greece:

Aetorrachi, Arcadia, a village in Arcadia, part of the municipal unit Tropaia
Aetorrachi, Larissa, a village in the Larissa regional unit, part of the municipal unit Elassona
Aetorrachi, Elis, a village in Elis, part of the municipal unit Vouprasia
Aetorrachi, Ioannina, a village in the Ioannina regional unit, part of the municipal unit Katsanochoria